The 1985 LSU Tigers football team represented Louisiana State University during the 1985 NCAA Division I-A football season. The team was led by Bill Arnsparger in his second season and finished with an overall record of nine wins, two losses, and one tie (9–2–1 overall, 4–1–1 in the SEC).

Schedule

Roster

Rankings

Game summaries

at North Carolina

    
    
    
    
    
    

Dalton Hilliard ran for 2 touchdowns and Ron Lewis kicked a school-record 54-yard field goal.

Colorado State

Florida

at Vanderbilt

Kentucky

at Ole Miss

Alabama

Mississippi State

at Notre Dame

at Tulane

East Carolina

vs. Baylor (Liberty Bowl)

1986 NFL Draft

References

LSU
LSU Tigers football seasons
Southeastern Conference football champion seasons
LSU Tigers football